The Critics' Choice Movie Award for Best Documentary Feature is a retired award given to people working in the motion picture industry by the Broadcast Film Critics Association from 1995 to 2015. In 2016, the association started a new set of awards for documentary features called the Critics' Choice Documentary Awards.

List of winners and nominees

1990s
 1995: Crumb
 1996: When We Were Kings
 1997: 4 Little Girls
 1998: Wild Man Blues
 1999: Buena Vista Social Club

2000s
 2000: The Life and Times of Hank Greenberg
 2001: N/A

 2002: Bowling for Columbine
 The Kid Stays in the Picture
 Standing in the Shadows of Motown

 2003: Capturing the Friedmans
 The Fog of War
 Ghosts of the Abyss

 2004: Fahrenheit 9/11
 Control Room
 Metallica: Some Kind of Monster
 Super Size Me

 2005: March of the Penguins
 Enron: The Smartest Guys in the Room
 Grizzly Man
 Mad Hot Ballroom
 Murderball

 2006: An Inconvenient Truth
 Dixie Chicks: Shut Up and Sing
 This Film Is Not Yet Rated
 Who Killed the Electric Car?
 Wordplay

 2007: Sicko
 Darfur Now
 In the Shadow of the Moon
 The King of Kong: A Fistful of Quarters
 No End in Sight
 Sharkwater

 2008: Man on Wire
 Darfur Now
 I.O.U.S.A.
 Roman Polanski: Wanted and Desired
 Standard Operating Procedure
 Young@Heart

 2009: The Cove
 Anvil! The Story of Anvil
 Capitalism: A Love Story
 Food, Inc.
 Michael Jackson's This Is It

2010s
 2010: Waiting for "Superman"
 Exit Through the Gift Shop
 Inside Job
 Joan Rivers: A Piece of Work
 Restrepo
 The Tillman Story

 2011: George Harrison: Living in the Material World
 Buck
 Cave of Forgotten Dreams
 Page One: Inside the New York Times
 Project Nim
 Undefeated

 2012: Searching for Sugar Man
 Bully
 The Central Park Five
 The Imposter
 The Queen of Versailles
 West of Memphis

 2013: 20 Feet from Stardom
 The Act of Killing
 Blackfish
 Stories We Tell
 Tim's Vermeer

  2014: Life Itself
 Citizenfour
 Glen Campbell: I'll Be Me
 Jodorowsky's Dune
 Last Days in Vietnam
 The Overnighters

 2015: Amy
 Cartel Land
 Going Clear
 He Named Me Malala
 The Look of Silence
 Where to Invade Next

See also
 Academy Award for Best Documentary Feature
 BAFTA Award for Best Documentary
 Critics' Choice Documentary Award for Best Documentary Feature
 Golden Globe Award for Best Documentary Film
 Independent Spirit Award for Best Documentary Feature

References

External links
 Official website of Critics' Choice Awards

F
Lists of films by award
American documentary film awards
Awards established in 1995
Awards disestablished in 2015